Titi Dwi Jayati (born 27 May 1966), known as Titi DJ, is an Indonesian pop diva singer, songwriter, and talent show judge. She was a judge on Indonesian Idol from season 1 to 5 and season 8, Golden Memories Vol.1 and 2, Q Academy season 1, The Voice Indonesia season 3 and 4. She is known for the song "Sang Dewi". She was the first Indonesian female singer invited to perform a concert at Marina Bay Sands in Singapore and the first Indonesian singer to make perform seven concerts in a four-day period. She was the first female coach to win The Voice Indonesia in 2019.  In the 80's she widely known with the song Ekspresi (Expression), the jazz fusion hit she collaborated with Indonesian jazz legend Indra Lesmana in 1988. In the 1990s she widely known with the song Bahasa Kalbu (Voice of the Heart), receiving 5 awards in AMI Awards (Anugerah Musik Indonesia). In the 2000s she widely known with the song Sang Dewi, Takkan Ada Cinta Yang Lain, Hanya Cinta Yang Bisa. Sang Dewi known to be her big hits in her career. In early 2010s she widely known with the song "Jangan Biarkan". Covering Indonesian Famous Nostalgic Singer Diana Nasution. One of the biggest television channel in Indonesia, RCTI, make her a concert "Jangan Biarkan Concert" to salute her album "Titi to Diana". In 2010s she widely known with the song Show Off Your Colors collaborate with Eka Gustiwana and Sarah Fajira. She became known publicly when representing Indonesia in the event of Miss World on the same year in London, United Kingdom, fellow with actress Michelle Yeoh (Miss Malaysia) dan Maggie Cheung (Miss Hongkong).

Titi DJ's most successful album was Bahasa Kalbu (1999), which made her the biggest winner at the 3rd Anugerah Musik Indonesia Awards, with five wins including Album of the Year, Artist of the Year, and Songwriter of the Year.

Career
Titi was born in Jakarta parents of an Indonesian Chinese-Batak-Manado descent. She began singing on public television as a teenager, with ambitions to become a recording artist. At age 17, she represented Indonesia in the Miss World 1983 competition, but was not a finalist. Also a dancer, she performed with Guruh Soekarnoputra's Swara Mahardhikka troupe. She sang backup vocals for Chrisye and appeared in a few movies early in her career. She released her first solo album in 1984, Imajinasi. Her singing career flourished in the 1990s, with the hit singles "Bintang-Bintang" ("Stars"), "Ekspresi" ("Expression") and "Salahkah Aku" ("Am I Wrong?"). Currently, she is one of the three Indonesian divas that formed a group together with Krisdayanti and Ruth Sahanaya called 3 Diva.

In 2010, she appeared as Bunda Ratu in Madame X, an action comedy film about a transgender hairdresser who is also a spy/superhero.

Personal life
Titi's first marriage was to actor Bucek Depp and she converted to Islam in 1995, with whom she has three children, twin daughters Salma Mucthar Depp and Salwa Mucthar Depp; and a son Daffa Mucthar Depp. The couple divorced in 1997. 
She went on to marry American teacher Andrew Hollis Dougharty in 1999, with whom she has one child, Stephanie Poetri Dougharty, who had pursued a musical career by releasing her debut single "I Love You 3000" in 2019. She and Dougharty divorced in 2006. 
Titi also had a six-year relationship with her musical collaborator, Indra Lesmana.
She married Indonesian rock singer Noviar Rachmansyah in 2007, and the couple divorced in August 2011.

In 2018, she joined the judging panel of season 3 of The Voice Indonesia.

Discography
 Imajinasi (1985)
 Yang Pertama Yang Bahahgia (1986)
 Ekspresi (1988)
 Titi DJ 1989 (1989)
 Take me to Heaven (1991)
 Bintang Bintang (1995)
 Kuingin (1996)
 Bahasa Kalbu (1999)
 Senyuman (2003)
 Melayani Hatimu (2005)
 Titi to Diana (2010)
 Titi in Love with Yovie (2015)

Awards

Magazine and tabloid coverage 
 Tabloid Nova (February 1996 (with Bucek Depp), November 1999 (with Andrew Dougharty))
 Tabloid Wanita Indonesia (17–23 January 2000, with Andrew Dougharty)
 Tabloid Bintang (October 1999, with Andrew Dougharty)
 Majalah Femina (4–10 October 1999, 16–22 January 2003)

References

1966 births
Anugerah Musik Indonesia winners
Converts to Islam from Christianity
Indonesian former Christians
Indonesian beauty pageant winners
21st-century Indonesian women singers
Indonesian Idol
Indonesian Muslims
Indonesian people of Chinese descent
Indonesian pop singers
Living people
Minahasa people
Miss World 1983 delegates
People from Jakarta
People of Batak descent
20th-century Indonesian women singers